Dominique Follacci (born 18 May 1879, date of death unknown) was a French gymnast. He competed in the men's artistic individual all-around event at the 1908 Summer Olympics.

Life and career
Follaci was interested in sports from childhood. He become a director of the Languedocienne Gymnastics Society. He received several prizes while presenting this organization in competitions like Dijon 1899, Paris 1900, Nice 1901.

References

1879 births
Year of death missing
French male artistic gymnasts
Olympic gymnasts of France
Gymnasts at the 1908 Summer Olympics
People from Annaba
Migrants from French Algeria to France